Rosalie van der Hoek (born 16 December 1994) is a Dutch tennis player.

Van der Hoek, who prefers clay courts, has a career-high doubles ranking of world No. 83, achieved on 18 October 2021.

She made her WTA Tour main-draw debut at the 2017 Washington Open in the doubles competition, partnering Chayenne Ewijk.

In early 2020, she tested positive for COVID-19, and again, prior to the commencement of the Palermo Ladies Open.

WTA career finals

Doubles: 2 (2 runner-ups)

ITF Circuit finals

Doubles: 51 (30 titles, 21 runner–ups)

ITF Junior finals

Singles: 1 (runner–up)

Doubles: 11 (5 titles, 6 runner–ups)

References

External links
 
 

1994 births
Living people
Dutch female tennis players
21st-century Dutch women